Supraglacial means "of, relating to, or situated or occurring at the surface of a glacier". It may refer to:

 Supraglacial lake
 Supraglacial moraine
 Supraglacial till

Glaciology